Amico may refer to:

People

Italians
 Amico Agnifili (died 1476), Italian Roman Catholic bishop and cardinal
 Saint Amico (died ), the patron saint of the Italian comune San Pietro Avellana
 Amico, O.S.B. Roman Catholic monk, abbot, and cardinal (1117–1130)
 Antonio Amico (died 1641), Roman Catholic Canon of Palermo
 Francesco Amico (born 1578), prominent Catholic theologian
 Bartholomeus Amicus (1562–1649; also Bartolomeo Amico), Jesuit priest, teacher and writer
 Amico Aspertini, Italian Renaissance painter and sculptor
 Amico Bignami (1862–1929), Italian physician, pathologist, malariologist and sceptic
 Amico Ricci (1794–1862), Italian art historian and marquess

Other people
 Joe Amico (born 1995), American professional soccer player
 Vinnie Amico, drummer and member of the American jamband moe
 Leah O'Brien (born 1974; née Amico), American athlete, Olympian, and sports commentator

Other
 Amico (film), a 1949 West German comedy film
 Azar Motor Industrial Co (AMICO), an Iranian truck manufacturer
 Intellivision Amico, an upcoming video game console

See also
 D'Amico